"Abomination of desolation" is a phrase from the Book of Daniel describing the pagan sacrifices with which the 2nd century BCE Greek king Antiochus IV replaced the twice-daily offering in the Jewish temple, or alternatively the altar on which such offerings were made. In the 1st century CE it was taken up by the authors of the gospels in the context of the Roman destruction of Jerusalem and the temple in the year 70, with Mark giving Jesus a speech concerning the Second Coming,  adding a reference to Daniel and  giving a description of the Roman armies ("But when you see Jerusalem surrounded by armies..."); in all three it is likely that the authors had in mind a future eschatological (i.e., end-time) event, and perhaps the activities of some antichrist.

Book of Daniel

Chapters 1–6 of the Book of Daniel originated as a collection of folk tales among the Jewish community in the late 4th to early 3rd centuries BCE. At that time, a lamb was sacrificed twice daily, morning and evening, on the altar of the Jewish temple in Jerusalem. In 167 BCE, Antiochus IV, the king of the Greek Seleucid dynasty which then ruled Palestine, put an end to the practice. In reaction to this, the visionary chapters of Daniel, chapters 7–12, were added to reassure Jews that they would survive in the face of this threat. In Daniel 8, one angel asks another how long "the transgression that makes desolate" will last; Daniel 9 tells of "the prince who is to come" who "shall make sacrifice and offering cease, and in their place shall be an abomination that desolates"; Daniel 11 tells the history of the arrogant foreign king who sets up the "abomination that makes desolate"; and in Daniel 12 the prophet is told how many days will pass "from the time that the regular burnt offering is taken away and the abomination that desolates is set up".

One of the more popular older views was to see in the "abomination" a contemptuous deformation (or dysphemism) of the Phoenician deity Baal Shamin, the "Lord of Heaven"; Philo of Byblos identified Baal Shamin with the Greek sky god Zeus, and as the temple in Jerusalem was rededicated in honor of Zeus (according to 2 Maccabees 6:2), older commentators tended to follow Porphyry in seeing the "abomination" in terms of a statue of the Greek sky god. More recently, it has been suggested that the reference is to certain sacred stones (possibly meteorites) that were fixed to the temple's altar of sacrifice for the purposes of pagan worship, since the use of such stones is well-attested in Canaanite and Syrian cults. Both proposals have been criticized on the basis that they are too speculative, or dependent on flawed analysis, or not well-suited to the relevant context in the Book of Daniel; and more recent scholarship tends to see the "abomination" as a reference to either the pagan offerings that replaced the forbidden twice-daily Jewish offering (cf. Daniel 11:31, 12:11; 2 Maccabees 6:5), or the pagan altar on which such offerings were made.

New Testament

In 63 BCE, the Romans captured Jerusalem and Judea became an outpost of the Roman Empire, but in 66 CE the Jews rose in revolt against the Romans as their ancestors had once done against Antiochus. The resulting First Jewish–Roman War ended in 70 CE when the legions of the Roman general Titus surrounded and eventually captured Jerusalem; the city and the temple were razed to the ground, and the only habitation on the site until the first third of the next century was a Roman military camp. It was against this background that the gospels were written, Mark around 70 AD and Matthew and Luke around 80–85. It is almost certain that none of the authors were eyewitnesses to the life of Jesus, and Mark was the source used by the authors of Matthew and Luke for their "abomination of desolation" passages.

Chapter 13 of Mark's gospel is a speech of Jesus concerning the return of the Son of Man and the advent of the Kingdom of God, which will be signaled by the appearance of the "abomination of desolation". It begins with Jesus in the temple informing his disciples that "not one stone here will be left on another, all will be thrown down"; the disciples ask when this will happen, and in  Jesus tells them: "[W]hen you see the abomination of desolation standing where he ought not to be (let the reader understand), then let those who are in Judea flee to the mountains" (Mark 13:14). Mark's terminology is drawn from Daniel, but he places the fulfilment of the prophecy in his own day, underlining this in Mark 13:30 by stating that "this generation will not pass away before all these things take place." While Daniel's "abomination" was probably a pagan altar or sacrifice, Mark uses a masculine participle for "standing", indicating a concrete historical person: several candidates have been suggested, but the most likely is Titus.

The majority of scholars believe that Mark was the source used by the authors of Matthew and Luke for their "abomination of desolation" passages.  follows Mark 13:14 closely: "So when you see the abomination of desolation spoken of by the prophet Daniel, standing in the holy place (let the reader understand), then let those who are in Judea flee to the mountains"; but unlike Mark, Matthew uses a neutral participle instead of a masculine one, and explicitly identifies Daniel as his prophetic source.  drops the "abomination" entirely: "But when you see Jerusalem surrounded by armies, then know that its desolation has come near. Then let those who are in Judea flee to the mountains, and let those who are inside the city depart, and let not those who are out in the country enter it." In all three it is likely that the authors had in mind a future eschatological (i.e., end-time) event, and perhaps the activities of some antichrist.

See also
 Related Bible parts: Daniel 7, Daniel 8, Daniel 11, Daniel 12, Matthew 24, Mark 13
 Abomination (Judaism)
 Apocalypticism
 Mount of Temptation
 Judgment day
 Prophecy of Seventy Weeks
 Summary of Christian eschatological differences

Notes

References

Bibliography 

 
 
 
 
 
 
 
 
 
 
 
 
 
 
 
 
 
 
 
 

Biblical phrases
Book of Daniel
Religious terminology